Esther Parada (1938–2005) was an American photographer, activist, teacher and author.

Early life and education
Parada received a Bachelor of Arts degree in art history, literature and history from Swarthmore College in 1960. In 1971 she began studies at the Chicago Institute of Design.

Career
In the mid-1960s, Parada went to Bolivia as a Peace Corps volunteer. The photographs she took there would become a significant part of the work she is known for.

From 1974 to 2005 she was a professor of photography at the University of Illinois Chicago's School of Art and Design.

Her work is included in the collection of the Museum of Fine Arts Houston, the Minneapolis Institute of Art, the Yale University Art Gallery, and the Art Institute of Chicago.

References

1938 births
2005 deaths
20th-century American photographers
21st-century American photographers
20th-century American women artists
21st-century American women artists